The Yasawa Group is an archipelago of about 20 volcanic islands in the Western Division of Fiji, with an approximate total area of .

Geography 

The Yasawa volcanic group consists of six main islands and numerous smaller islets.

History 
The British navigator William Bligh was the first European to sight the Yasawas in 1789, following the Mutiny on the Bounty. Captain Barber in  visited the islands in 1794, but they were not charted until 1840, when they were surveyed and charted by a United States expedition commanded by Charles Wilkes.

Throughout the 1800s, Tongan raiders bartered for, and sometimes stole, the sail mats for which the Yasawas were famous. The islands were largely ignored by the wider world until World War II, when the United States military used them as communications outposts.

Tourism, economy and culture 

Until 1987, it was the policy of the Fiji government that the Yasawa Group was closed to land-based tourism because the king of the Yasawa Group, who was not controlled by the government, did not want tourism. There were limited cruise operations since the 1950s, but passengers had to stay aboard their ships. Without tourism, the local residents lived in peace and harmony in a communal atmosphere. Since the Fijian government lifted the restrictions on land-based tourism in the Yasawa Group, a number of resorts have been established there. Due to its freehold real-estate status, three budget resorts have been operating on Tavewa island since the early 1980s.

Access 

As one of the outer island chains, options to get to the Yasawa Islands are a bit more limited than some of the closer islands to Nadi and Denarau. Sea planes from local airlines (like Turtle Airways) make multiple flights to the Yasawa resorts per day, and charters are also available. Helicopter charters are also available or one can take the Yasawa Flyer, a catamaran.

References

External links 
 Backpackers and Billionaires - article about the Yasawa Group's (and Fiji's) history
 

 
Ba Province
Archipelagoes of Fiji
Volcanic groups
Archipelagoes of the Pacific Ocean